Bob and Mike Bryan, the two-time defending champions in this event, successfully defended their title. They defeated Mahesh Bhupathi and Leander Paes 6–3, 6–4 in the final.

Seeds

Draw

Finals

Top half

Section 1

Section 2

Bottom half

Section 3

Section 4

References

External links
 2011 Australian Open – Men's draws and results at the International Tennis Federation

Men's Doubles
Australian Open - Men's Doubles
Australian Open (tennis) by year – Men's doubles